Christine Noonan (born Christine Elizabeth Wright; 8 March 1945 – 6 August 2003) was a British actress. She is best remembered for her role as the anarchist love interest of Malcolm McDowell in the film if.... (1968). In one scene, which gained particular notice in British cinema of the period, she impersonated a tiger and had sexual intercourse with McDowell's character Mick Travis on the floor of a cafe, which with the later violence in the film led to an X rating, leading Paramount to later cut the sexual content from the film. Noonan said of the scene in the film: "He was stark naked and I was stark naked, but we were both so busy fighting that I can't remember what he looked like in the nude". Her husband initially protested when he learned of the nature of the role, but he agreed to her acting in it once she explained the point of the film and the context.

Noonan also appeared opposite McDowell in two minor roles in the film O Lucky Man! (1973), and also appeared in the films Oh! What a Lovely War (1969), Malatesta (1970) and Backwoods (1987). She found work on the stage in the 1970s, performing in George Etherege's comedy She Would If She Could for the Nuffield Theatre Company at Lancaster University in 1972. Noonan played the brief role of Barberina in Dennis Potter's TV serial Casanova (1971); her scene is repeated multiple times during the six episodes. Her last role was as a business woman in the series Babylon 5 in 1997.

Noonan was often out of work as an actress and worked selling wool in an Army and Navy store. She was married to Denis Noonan, and later to Lawrence Dennett, with whom she had three children. She died in 2003 at age 58, from cancer.

Filmography

References

External links

1945 births
2003 deaths
British actresses